Christine Brunner (born 25 September 1959) is an Austrian luger who competed in the late 1970s and early 1980s. She is best known for finishing third overall in the Luge World Cup women's singles twice (1978–79, 1979–80).

Brunner also finished tenth in the women's singles event at the 1980 Winter Olympics in Lake Placid.

References

External links
1980 luge women's singles results
List of women's singles luge World Cup champions since 1978.

1959 births
Living people
Austrian female lugers
Lugers at the 1980 Winter Olympics
Olympic lugers of Austria